The 1894 Chicago vs. Stanford football game, played on December 25, 1894 was a college football game between the Chicago Maroons and Stanford.  Chicago won 24 to 4. The game was played in San Francisco, California. It was the first postseason intersectional contest, foreshadowing the modern bowl game. Herbert Hoover was Stanford's student financial manager.

Game summary
Neither team scored in the first half. Freshman Clarence Herschberger played well.

Aftermath
Stanford won a rematch in Los Angeles on December 29 by 12 to 0.

References

1894 college football season
vs. Chicago 1894
vs. Stanford 1894
1894 in sports in California
December 1894 sports events